The Women's individual pursuit competition at the 2022 UCI Track Cycling World Championships was held on 15 October 2022.

Results

Qualifying
The qualifying was started at 14:18. The two fasters riders raced for gold, the third and fourth fastest riders raced for bronze.

Finals
The finals were started at 19:41.

References

Women's individual pursuit